The 1990 Breyers Tennis Classic was a women's tennis tournament played on indoor hard courts at the Crestview Country Club in Wichita, Kansas in the United States and was part of  the Tier IV category of the 1990 WTA Tour. It was the 10th, and last, edition of the tournament and was held from February 5 through February 11, 1990. Unseeded Dianne Van Rensburg won the singles title and earned $27,000 first-prize money.

Finals

Singles
 Dianne Van Rensburg defeated  Nathalie Tauziat 2–6, 7–5, 6–2
 It was Van Rensburg's only singles title of her career.

Doubles
 Manon Bollegraf /  Meredith McGrath defeated  Mary-Lou Daniels /  Wendy White 6–0, 6–2

Prize money

References

External links
 ITF tournament edition details
 Tournament draws

Virginia Slims of Kansas
Virginia Slims of Kansas
Virgin
Virgin
Virginia Slims of Kansas